The Mira Foundation (Fondation Mira) is a Quebec-based  community-based organization which pursues the following stated objective: "to bring greater autonomy to handicapped people and to facilitate their social integration by providing them with [guide and service] dogs that have been fully trained to accommodate each individual's needs of adaptation and rehabilitation." Mira assistance dogs are provided free of charge to disabled persons.

Founded in 1981 by its CEO Éric St-Pierre, "Mira Foundation services are offered to anyone presenting with one or more of the following disabilities: visual, auditory and physical."

Its head office and training facilities are located in Sainte-Madeleine, Quebec.

Among supporters and spokespeople of the Mira Foundation have been Québécois actors Robert Brouillette, Roy Dupuis, Jean L'Italien, and Stéphane Rousseau. Additionally, a known guide dog user from Mira is YouTuber Molly Burke.

External links
 Fondation Mira (Mira Foundation): Official site
 Stars at Mira (featured link on official site)
 Défi-Vision 2005 (18th edition) (official press release)
 Mira USA

Medical and health organizations based in Quebec
Disability organizations based in Canada
Blindness organizations in Canada